Isola Bella is a 1961 West German comedy film directed by Hans Grimm and starring Marianne Hold, Paul Hubschmid and Monika Dahlberg. It is mainly set in the Italian-speaking Swiss region of Ticino.

The film's sets were designed by the art director Max Mellin. It was shot in agfacolor.

Cast
 Marianne Hold as Anne Stülcken
 Paul Hubschmid as Götz Renner
 Monika Dahlberg as Ulrike Höfler
 Claus Biederstaedt as Hubert Bergmann
 Willy Fritsch as Konsul Stülcken
 Ruth Stephan as Frl. Finkenbusch
 Oliver Grimm as Jakob
 Harald Juhnke as Anton
 Michl Lang as Weinbauer
 Rudolf Schündler as Dr. Bergmann
 Hanita Hallan as Eva
 Herbert Hübner
 Erik Jelde as Guttmann
 Ferdinand Anton
 Lolita as Monika
 Barbro Svensson as Gesang
 Gus Backus as Gesang
 Carlos Otero as Gesang
 Max Greger
 Karin Heske

References

Bibliography 
 Bock, Hans-Michael & Bergfelder, Tim. The Concise CineGraph. Encyclopedia of German Cinema. Berghahn Books, 2009.

External links 
 

1961 films
1961 romantic comedy films
German romantic comedy films
West German films
1960s German-language films
Films directed by Hans Grimm
Films set in Switzerland
1960s German films